Dennis Kuipers (born 23 November 1985, in Almelo) is a Dutch rally driver.

Career
The son of businessman and part-time rally driver Rene Kuipers, Dennis began rallying in his home country in 2007. He made his debut in the World Rally Championship at the 2008 Rallye Deutschland, finishing 18th in a Ford Focus RS WRC. He also competed at the 2009 Rally Portugal and 2009 Rally GB. In 2010, after doing the 2010 Rally Sweden in a Focus WRC, he began driving a Ford Fiesta S2000, entered by the Stobart Ford World Rally Team. In his first rally in the car, in Turkey, he finished ninth overall, scoring two points.

For 2011 he will be driving a Ford Fiesta RS WRC on 11 rally's. He scored points in Portugal, Jordan, Greece, Germany, France, Spain and Wales. In France, he became the best scoring Dutchman in the WRC with his fifth-place finish.

WRC results

References

External links

 Profile at eWRC-results.com

1985 births
Living people
Dutch rally drivers
World Rally Championship drivers
Sportspeople from Almelo
20th-century Dutch people
21st-century Dutch people

M-Sport drivers